Carl Ferdinand Howard Henry (January 22, 1913 – December 7, 2003) was an American evangelical Christian theologian who provided intellectual and institutional leadership to the neo-evangelical movement in the mid-to-late 20th century. His early book, The Uneasy Conscience of Modern Fundamentalism (1947), was influential in calling evangelicals to differentiate themselves from separatist fundamentalism and claim a role in influencing the wider American culture. He was involved in the creation of numerous major evangelical organizations, including the National Association of Evangelicals, Fuller Theological Seminary, Evangelical Theological Society, Christianity Today magazine (of which he was the founding editor), and the Institute for Advanced Christian Studies. The Carl F. H. Henry Institute for Evangelical Engagement at Southern Baptist Theological Seminary and the Carl F. H. Henry Center for Theological Understanding at Trinity International University seek to carry on his legacy.

Early life
Henry grew up in Long Island, New York as the son of German immigrants, Karl F. Heinrich and Johanna Vaethroeder (Väthröder). After his high school graduation in 1929 he began working in newspaper journalism. While not unacquainted with Christianity, his first experience indicating a personal God came as he worked at a weekly newspaper office, proofreading galleys with a middle-aged woman, Mildred Christy. When Henry used Christ's name as a swear word, Christy commented, "Carl, I'd rather you slap my face than take the name of my best Friend in vain."

In 1932, at the age of 19, he became editor of The Smithtown Times and later a stringer for The New York Times. The next year, after becoming a Christian, he decided to go to college to begin a life of Christian service. Frank E. Gaebelein, then headmaster of The Stony Brook School, gave him a catalogue to the evangelical liberal arts Wheaton College. He enrolled in 1935, where he was greatly influenced by the philosophical teaching of Gordon Clark. While at Wheaton, Henry also taught typing and journalism. There he met Helga, a missionary kid, whom he married in August 1940.  He received both bachelor's and master's degrees from Wheaton. He then earned a Doctor of Theology degree from Northern Baptist Theological Seminary. He also earned a PhD from Boston University in 1949.

His wife Helga Bender Henry wrote a book in 1955 about the Union Rescue Mission in Los Angeles. In 1999 she published Cameroon on a Clear Day about her parents' work in that country.

Their son Paul B. Henry was a U.S. Congressman from Michigan from 1985 until his death in 1993.

Career
Henry was ordained as a Baptist minister in 1942 and taught at Northern Baptist Theological Seminary from 1942 to 1947. Also in 1942, Henry took part in launching the National Association of Evangelicals, serving on its board for several years and being book editor of their magazine United Evangelical Action.

His second book, is a critique that rejects modern liberalism and preserves a doctrinal focus on the Bible, but also rejects the rigidness and disengagement of Fundamentalists. The book firmly established Henry as one of the leading Evangelical scholars.

The same year that Uneasy Conscience was published, Henry joined with Harold Ockenga, Harold Lindsell, Edward John Carnell, and radio evangelist Charles E. Fuller to help establish Fuller Theological Seminary in Pasadena, California. He served as acting dean in the seminary's first year and remained there as a professor until he left to establish Christianity Today magazine.

In 1949, Henry was part of the meeting of evangelical scholars who discussed the need for an organization "to promote serious academic discussion," and suggested the name adopted by the resulting organization: the Evangelical Theological Society.

In 1956, Henry became the first editor-in-chief of the magazine Christianity Today, which was founded by evangelist Billy Graham to serve as a scholarly voice for evangelical Christianity and a challenge to the liberal Christian Century. He was the magazine's editor until 1968.

Henry taught as a visiting professor or guest lecturer at colleges, universities, seminaries, and conferences across the United States and around the world, including in Japan, Singapore, India, Liberia, South Korea, Yugoslavia, the Philippines, the Netherlands, and Romania. These institutions include the Asian Center for Theological Studies and Mission, Bethel University (Minnesota), Christian Theological Seminary, Columbia Bible College, Denver Conservative Baptist Seminary, Gordon Divinity School (which is now known as Gordon-Conwell Theological Seminary), Hillsdale College, Hong Kong Baptist College (which is now called Hong Kong Baptist University), Latin American Theological Seminary, Soongsil University, Eastern Baptist Theological Seminary (now renamed as Palmer Theological Seminary), The Southern Baptist Theological Seminary, Trinity Evangelical Divinity School, and Winona Lake Summer School of Theology. He also served as the chairman for international conferences and consultations, including the World Congress on Evangelism in Berlin in 1966.

In the early 1980s Henry was a founding board member of the Institute on Religion and Democracy, with which he remained active until the mid-1990s.

Henry's magnum opus was a six-volume work entitled God, Revelation, and Authority, completed in 1983. He concluded "that if we humans say anything authentic about God, we can do so only on the basis of divine self-revelation; all other God-talk is conjectural." In his magnum opus he presented a version of Christian apologetics called presuppositional apologetics.  Henry regarded all truth as propositional, and Christian doctrine as "the theorems derived from the axioms of revelation."

His autobiography, Confessions of a Theologian, was published in 1986.

Henry died in 2003 at the age of 90.

Works
 "The Pacific Garden Mission" (Zondervan, 1942)
 Remaking the Modern Mind (Eerdmans, 1946)
 The Uneasy Conscience of Modern Fundamentalism (Eerdmans, 1947)
 The Evangelical Pulpit (Eerdmans, 1948)
 The Protestant Dilemma (Eerdmans, 1948).
 The Drift of Western Thought (Eerdmans, 1951)
 Christian Personal Ethics (Eerdmans, 1957)
 Contemporary Evangelical Thought (Channel Press, 1957) (editor)
 Evangelical Responsibility in Contemporary Theology (Eerdmans, 1957)
 Revelation and the Bible (Baker, 1958) (editor)
 Basic Christian Doctrines (Baker, 1962)
 Evangelicals at the Brink of Crisis (Word, 1967)
 Faith at the Frontiers (Moody, 1969)
 Evangelicals in Search of Identity (Word, 1976)
 God, Revelation and Authority, 6 vols. (Word, 1976–83).
 The Christian Mindset in a Secular Society (Multnomah, 1984)
 Christian Countermoves in a Decadent Culture (Multnomah, 1986)
 Confessions of a Theologian: An Autobiography (Word, 1986)
 Twilight of a Great Civilization (Crossway, 1988)
 Evangelical Affirmations (Zondervan, 1990) (editor, with Kenneth Kantzer)

Critical assessment and other secondary sources
 Joel A. Carpenter, ed. Two Reformers of Fundamentalism: Harold John Ockenga and Carl F. H. Henry (New York: Garland, 1988).
 D. A. Carson and John D. Woodbridge, eds. God and Culture: Essays in Honor of Carl F. H. Henry (Grand Rapids: William B. Eerdmans/Carlisle: Paternoster, 1993).
 G. Wright Doyle, Carl Henry: Theologian for All Seasons (Eugene, Oregon: Pickwick Publications, 2010).
 Matthew Hall and Owen Strachan, Essential Evangelicalism: The Enduring Influence of Carl F. H. Henry. (Crossway, 2015).
 George Marsden, Reforming Fundamentalism: Fuller Seminary and the New Evangelicalism (Grand Rapids: William B. Eerdmans, 1987).
 Eric J. Miller, "Carl F. H. Henry and Christianity Today: Responding to the 'Crisis of the West,' 1956–1968," M.A. Thesis, Trinity Evangelical Divinity School, 1994.
 James DeForest Murch, Cooperation without Compromise: A History of the National Association of Evangelicals (Grand Rapids: William B. Eerdmans, 1956).
 R. Albert Mohler, Jr., "Carl F. H. Henry," in George, Timothy and David S. Dockery, eds. Theologians of the Baptist Tradition, 279-96 (Nashville: Broadman & Holman Publishers, 2001).
 Bob E. Patterson, Carl F. H. Henry (Waco: Word, 1984).
 .
 .
 William C. Roach, Hermeneutics as Epistemology: A Critical Assessment of Carl F. H. Henry's Epistemological Approach to Hermeneutics (Eugene: Wipf & Stock, 2015)
 R. C. Sproul, John Gerstner and Arthur Lindsley, Classical Apologetics (Grand Rapids: Zondervan, 1984).
 Gregory Alan Thornbury, Recovering Classic Evangelicalism: Applying the Wisdom and Vision of Carl F. H. Henry (Wheaton: Crossway, 2013).

See also 
 Evangelicalism in the United States
 Fundamentalism

References

External links
 .
 .
 Carl F. H. Henry Institute for Evangelical Engagement

1913 births
2003 deaths
20th-century Calvinist and Reformed theologians
20th-century evangelicals
21st-century evangelicals
American Calvinist and Reformed theologians
American evangelicals
American people of German descent
Boston University School of Theology alumni
Christian apologists
Christian ethicists
Editors of Christian publications
Northern Baptist Theological Seminary alumni
People from Long Island
University and college founders
Wheaton College (Illinois) alumni